Kenneth Weekes Driver (1918-1947) was a South African Air Force pilot and fighter ace during World War II who recorded 10 'kills'

At the start of the war he was a flying instructor in the SAAF before serving with 6 Squadron on Home Defence. In December 1939 he joined 1 Squadron as a Flight Commander.

He was shot down in on 14 June 1941, spending the rest of the war as a Prisoner of War in Stalag Luft III. His opponent was the German ace Ludwig Franzisket of JG 27. The air battle was fought singularly, in a one-versus-one situation. Both men fired at each other, but only the German scored hits. Franzisket got too close and struck Driver's tail with a wing tip, damaging it. Franzisket remained ignorant of the collision, as did Driver, who was preparing to bail out, until after they met. Franzisket showed Driver around the damaged Bf 109. Driver showed Franzisket a picture and lock of hair belonging to his wife who had come to visit him in Cairo. The German promised to have a message dropped via container over his airfield informing her that Driver lived.

After the war he stayed in the SAAF but was killed in a flying accident in 1947 while attending a course.

See also
 List of World War II aces from South Africa

References

 
 

South African World War II flying aces
South African Air Force officers
South African military personnel of World War II
South African prisoners of war
1918 births
1947 deaths
Shot-down aviators